Mónika Remsei (born 2 October 1972) is a Hungarian rower. She competed at the 2000 Summer Olympics and the 2004 Summer Olympics.

References

External links
 

1972 births
Living people
Hungarian female rowers
Olympic rowers of Hungary
Rowers at the 2000 Summer Olympics
Rowers at the 2004 Summer Olympics
Sportspeople from Székesfehérvár
20th-century Hungarian women
21st-century Hungarian women